Caroline Southwood Hill ( Smith; 21 March 1809 – 31 December 1902) was an English educationalist and writer. She established and ran a Pestalozzian infant school, was involved in many co-operative ventures, and moved in a radical circle of other reformers. She wrote three children's books and contributed works to a range of publications such as The Nineteenth Century and Charles Dickens's Household Words.

She was the daughter of Thomas Southwood Smith (1788–1861), a physician and sanitary reformer. She was the mother of Octavia Hill (1838–1912) and Miranda Hill (1836–1910), both activists and social reformers; and Emily who married the son of Christian Socialist F. D. Maurice.

References

1809 births
1902 deaths
English schoolteachers
19th-century women educators
Women educational theorists
British cooperative organizers
English writers
19th-century English women writers
19th-century English novelists
19th-century English non-fiction writers